Josefin Christensen (born 13 October 1982) is a retired Swedish footballer. Christensen was part of the Djurgården Swedish champions' team of 2003.

Christensen played for Sweden in the 2000 UEFA Women's Under-18 Championship.

Honours

Club 
 Djurgården/Älvsjö 
 Damallsvenskan: 2003

References

Swedish women's footballers
Djurgårdens IF Fotboll (women) players
Hammarby Fotboll (women) players
1982 births
Living people
Women's association footballers not categorized by position
IF Brommapojkarna (women) players